Tulia is a feminine given name. It may refer to the following people:
Tulia Ackson, Deputy Speaker of the National Assembly of Tanzania 
Tulia Alemán (born 1993), Venezuelan model and beauty pageant titleholder
Tulia Biczak, Polish singer and namesake of the musical group Tulia (band)
Tulia Ciámpoli (1915–1981), Argentine actress, dancer, and violinist
Tulia Medina (born 1983), Colombian weightlifter